Little Joe Tower is a landmark structure in Corning, New York, United States.

The tower was built in either 1912 or 1913 by Corning Glass Works (now known as Corning Inc.). The construction came during a period of growth for the company, and the  tower was used in drawing glass for thermometer tubes. On the outside of the white tower is a blue stenciled silhouette of "Little Joe", a glassblower, giving the tower its name. In the 1940s, advancements in drawing technology reduced the use of the tower, and in June 1973, the tower was decommissioned. However, the company continues to maintain the building, which the Star-Gazette claims is "the Corning area's best known landmark". In 1999, the tower was repainted, and in 2015, the tower experienced a renovation that began in May and ended in August.

References 

1912 establishments in New York (state)
1913 establishments in New York (state)
Buildings and structures in Steuben County, New York
Corning Inc.
Corning, New York
Industrial buildings completed in 1912
Industrial buildings completed in 1913